This is a list of the Irish language radio stations in Ireland.

Irish-language radio stations
There are four radio stations that broadcast entirely in Irish:

National
RTÉ Raidió na Gaeltachta (RnaG) - national radio station and part of the RTÉ group.

Youth
Raidió Rí-Rá - a youth-oriented chart music station, currently broadcasting on the internet and in several places on DAB.

Generalist
Raidió Na Life - broadcasting in the Greater Dublin area.
Raidió Fáilte - broadcasting in the Greater Belfast area.

See also
List of Irish language media
List of television channels available in the Republic of Ireland

Gaelic
Lists of radio stations by language
Ireland-related lists